Samba-choro is a subgenre of samba that emerged in Rio de Janeiro in early 1930s in Brazil. It was a syncopated hybrid fusion of samba with the Brazilian instrumental genre choro, but with medium tempo and presence of lyrics.

Created by the Brazilian music industry, samba-choro was released with “Love in excess”, by Gadé and Valfrido Silva, in 1932. One of the most popular songs of this subgenre is “Carinhoso”, by Pixinguinha. Originally released as choro in 1917, this composition received lyrics and ended up relaunched two decades later, in the voice of Orlando Silva, with great commercial success. In the following decade, the cavaquinista Waldir Azevedo would popularize chorinho, a kind of fast-paced instrumental samba.

References

Sources 

 

 
Brazilian music
Brazilian styles of music